The Morwell National Park is a national park located in the western Gippsland region of Victoria, Australia. The park preserves a remnant of previously widespread wet sclerophyll forests and some rainforest remnants restricted to deep creek gullies. 320 plant species have been recorded for this park, including five rare or threatened species and 44 orchid species. 129 native fauna species have been recorded, including 19 mammals, 96 birds, 11 reptiles and three amphibians.

Weeds and pest animals represent a threat to the park, particularly because of its small size.

See also

 Backusella morwellensis – named after Morwell National Park
 Protected areas of Victoria

References

External links

Friends of Morwell National Park - includes photographs of tracks

National parks of Victoria (Australia)
Protected areas established in 1966
1966 establishments in Australia
Morwell, Victoria